Felice Gimondi (29 September 1942 – 16 August 2019) was an Italian professional racing cyclist. With his 1968 victory at the Vuelta a España, only three years after becoming a professional cyclist, Gimondi, nicknamed "The Phoenix", was the second cyclist (after Jacques Anquetil) to win all three Grand Tours of road cycling: Tour de France (1965, his first year as a pro), Giro d'Italia (1967, 1969 and 1976), and Vuelta a España (1968). He is one of only seven cyclists to have done so.

Gimondi also won three of the five Cycling monuments, winning the Giro di Lombardia twice, and finished on the podium of a grand tour twelve times.

He accomplished all of these major victories despite his career coinciding with that of Eddy Merckx.

Biography

Gimondi was born on 29 September 1942 in Sedrina in the Province of Bergamo. He was the son of a transport manager and a post mistress. In his youth, he frequently took his mother's post bicycle and later helped to deliver mail on it. In 1964, Gimondi rode the road race at the 1964 Olympic Games, where he finished in 33rd place. After winning the Tour de l'Avenir, he was signed, in 1965, as a professional to the Salvarani team. With the withdrawal of another cyclist from Salvarani's 1965 Tour de France team, Gimondi was added at the last minute and later recalled that he had to ask his mother for permission to start the race. He took the yellow jersey on stage 3, but lost the race lead later when he waited for his nominal team captain Vittorio Adorni. Adorni later dropped out, leaving Gimondi to fight out the overall victory with Raymond Poulidor, securing the Tour in the final time trial.

His early successes led to him being regarded as a successor to well-renowned fellow Italian Fausto Coppi, nicknamed campionissimo. Gimondi's career coincided for the most part with that of highly-successful Eddy Merckx. However, Gimondi was able to build up a respectable palmarès himself, even through the era of Merckx' dominance.

After winning the 1967 Giro d'Italia and the 1968 Vuelta a España, Gimondi had become the second-ever rider to have won all three Grand Tours after Jacques Anquetil. He won the Giro a further two times, first in 1969. In 1976, Gimondi was not counted among the favourites, being regarded as past his prime, but overcame a deficit on race leader Johan De Muynck in the final time trial to take his third victory in the race. His success was subsequently called the "miracle in Milan".

His other successes include four victories in the so-called "monument classics", winning Paris–Roubaix in 1966, Milan–San Remo in 1974 and the Giro di Lombardia twice (1966 and 1973). In the 1973 World Championship road race, he formed a group with Luis Ocaña and Freddy Maertens to bridge a gap to Merckx, who had attacked earlier. At the finish, he outsprinted Maertens to clinch the title. He had already placed third in 1970 and second in 1971. Gimondi also won Paris–Brussels twice, in 1966 and 1976.

He failed twice to pass doping controls, first in the 1968 Giro d'Italia and then at the 1975 Tour de France. His positive test at the 1968 Giro was for the stimulant Fencamfamin, but since the substance was not on the prohibited list at the time, he kept his third place overall at the race. At the 1975 Tour, he received a 10-minute time penalty.

A major cyclosportive event is named in his honour, the Gran Fondo Felice Gimondi, held annually around Bergamo. Since 2019, it honours all seven riders to have won all three Grand Tours.

Throughout his career and after it, Gimondi was closely associated with the bicycle manufacturer Bianchi. In the late 1980s, Gimondi was briefly directeur sportif at the Gewiss–Bianchi team. He served as manager for Bianchi's mountain-bike team for a long period of time. Between 2000 and 2001, Gimondi briefly worked as president of the  team and as an advisor to Marco Pantani. At the end of the 1998 Tour de France, race organiser Jean-Marie Leblanc invited Gimondi onto the stage during the podium celebration, when Pantani became the first Italian winner of the race since he had himself won the event in 1965. In 2008, Gimondi was the president of the TX Active – Bianchi cycling team which specializes in MTB races.

In 1968, Gimondi married Tiziana Bersano, with whom he had two daughters, Norma and Federica.

Gimondi died on 16 August 2019 after suffering a heart attack while swimming on vacation in Sicily. He was 76. His funeral was held on 20 August in Paladina near Bergamo, attended by thousands of people. His long-time rival Eddy Merckx did not attend, stating that he was "too saddened" by the loss of his friend.

Career achievements

Major results
Source:

1963
1st Giro del Friuli
1964
 1st  Overall Tour de l'Avenir
1st Stage 1 
1965
 1st  Overall Tour de France
1st Stages 3, 18 (ITT) & 22 (ITT)
 2nd La Flèche Wallonne
 3rd Overall Giro d'Italia
 3rd Tre Valli Varesine
 4th Overall Tour de Romandie
1966
 1st Paris–Roubaix
 1st Giro di Lombardia
 1st Paris–Brussels
 1st Coppa Agostoni
 1st Coppa Placci
 1st GP Valsassina
 2nd Trofeo Matteotti
 2nd Critérium des As
 2nd Grand Prix des Nations
 2nd Gran Premio di Lugano
 2nd Boucles de l'Aulne
 3rd Giro di Toscana
 5th Overall Giro d'Italia
1st Stage 20 
 8th Tre Valli Varesine
 9th Overall Tour of Belgium
 10th Overall Tour de Romandie
1st Stage 3b (ITT) 
 10th Tour of Flanders
 10th La Flèche Wallonne
1967
 1st  Overall Giro d'Italia
 1st Grand Prix des Nations
 1st Giro del Lazio
 1st Gran Premio di Lugano
 1st GP Forlì
 2nd Giro di Lombardia
 2nd Ronde de Seignelay
 3rd Overall Escalada a Montjuïc
 3rd Critérium des As
 3rd Coppa Bernocchi
 4th Road race, National Road Championships
 4th Tour of Flanders
 4th Milan–San Remo
 4th À travers Lausanne
 7th Overall Tour de France
1st Stages 10 & 20
 10th Trofeo Laigueglia
1968
 1st  Road race, National Road Championships (Giro di Romagna)
 1st  Overall Vuelta a España
1st Stage 17 (ITT) 
 1st Trofeo Baracchi
 1st Grand Prix des Nations
 1st Critérium des As
 1st Flèche Enghiennoise
 2nd Volta a Catalunya
 2nd Overall À travers Lausanne
 2nd Gran Premio di Lugano
 3rd Overall Giro d'Italia
1st Stage 16 (ITT)
 3rd Overall Paris–Luxembourg
 3rd Gent–Wevelgem
 3rd Boucles de l'Aulne
 4th La Flèche Wallonne
 6th Road race, UCI Road World Championships
 7th Giro di Lombardia
 8th Overall Giro di Sardegna
 8th Trofeo Laigueglia
 10th Tirreno–Adriatico
1969
 1st  Overall Giro d'Italia
 1st  Overall Tour de Romandie
 1st Giro dell'Appennino
 2nd Overall Paris–Luxembourg
1st Stage 1 
 2nd Overall Escalada a Montjuïc
1st Stage 1a 
 2nd Tour of Flanders
 3rd Giro dell'Emilia
 4th Overall Tour de France
1st Stage 12 
 4th Paris–Roubaix
 4th Barcelona-Andorra
 7th Liège–Bastogne–Liège
 8th Trofeo Dicen
1970
 1st  Overall (TTT) Cronostaffetta
 1st Trofeo Matteotti
 2nd Overall Giro d'Italia
 2nd Giro di Lombardia
 2nd Road race, National Road Championships
 2nd Giro del Veneto
 2nd Genoa–Nice
 2nd Mont Faron hill climb  
 3rd Overall Tirreno–Adriatico
1st Stage 5b (ITT) 
 3rd Overall Giro di Sardegna
 3rd  Road race, UCI Road World Championships
 3rd Tre Valli Varesine
 5th Overall À travers Lausanne
 8th Overall Tour de Suisse
1st Stage 6 
 9th Giro dell'Emilia
 9th Coppa Placci
1971
 1st Giro del Piemonte
 1st Grand Prix de Wallonie
 1st Prologue Tour de Romandie
 1st Stage 2b (ITT) Cronostaffetta
 2nd  Road race, UCI Road World Championships
 2nd Road race, National Road Championships
 2nd Milan–San Remo
 2nd Gran Premio Città di Camaiore
 2nd GP Industria & Artigianato di Larciano
 4th Coppa Placci
 4th Coppa Bernocchi
 5th Overall Volta a Catalunya
 7th Overall Giro d'Italia
1st Stages 7 & 18
 8th Paris–Roubaix
 9th Overall Giro di Sardegna
 9th Liège–Bastogne–Liège
 9th Giro di Lombardia
 9th Tre Valli Varesine
1972
 1st  Road race, National Road Championships (Giro dell'Appennino)
 1st  Overall Volta a Catalunya
1st Stage 5b (ITT)
 1st Gran Premio di Lugano
 2nd Overall Tour de France
 2nd Gent–Wevelgem
 2nd Giro del Piemonte
 2nd Trofeo Baracchi
 3rd Giro di Lombardia
 3rd Giro dell'Emilia
 5th Giro della Romagna
 6th Overall Tirreno–Adriatico
 8th Overall Giro d'Italia
 9th Giro di Toscana
 10th Road race, UCI Road World Championships
1973
 1st  Road race, UCI World Road Championships
 1st  Overall Giro di Puglia
1st Stage 1
 1st Giro di Lombardia
 1st Giro del Piemonte 
 1st Trofeo Baracchi
 1st Coppa Bernocchi
 2nd Overall Giro d'Italia
1st Stage 16 (ITT)
 2nd Overall À travers Lausanne
 2nd Critérium des As
 3rd Milan–San Remo
 5th Giro della Romagna
 6th Overall Tour de Romandie
 6th Grand Prix of Aargau Canton
 7th Giro dell'Emilia
 10th Paris–Brussels
1974
 1st Milan–San Remo
 1st Coppa Agostoni
 2nd Road race, National Road Championships
 2nd Overall À travers Lausanne
1st Stage 1 
 3rd Overall Giro d'Italia
 3rd Trofeo Laigueglia
 3rd Giro dell'Umbria
 6th Gran Premio di Lugano
 6th Giro di Campania
 7th Paris–Brussels
1975
 1st  Overall Cronostaffetta
1st Stage 1b (ITT)
 2nd Giro dell'Emilia
 3rd Overall Giro d'Italia
 3rd Coppa Placci
 4th Overall Setmana Catalana de Ciclisme
 5th Overall Tirreno–Adriatico
 6th Overall Tour de France
1st Stage 10 
 6th Overall À travers Lausanne
 7th Overall Giro di Puglia
 7th Milano–Torino
 7th Gran Premio Città di Camaiore
 9th Coppa Sabatini
1976
 1st  Overall Giro d'Italia
1st Stage 21
 1st Paris–Brussels
 5th Giro del Lazio
 7th Road race, UCI Road World Championships
 7th Overall Tirreno–Adriatico
 8th Giro dell'Emilia
 8th Coppa Placci
1977
 2nd Giro del Lazio
 4th Overall Tour de Romandie
 5th Overall Escalada a Montjuïc
 6th Giro di Toscana
 10th Overall Giro di Puglia
1978
 2nd Châteauroux Classic
 10th Critérium des As

Grand Tour results timeline 

Source:

References

Further reading

External links 

Gimondi, The Phoenix by Gabe Konrad
Official Tour de France results for Felice Gimondi 

1942 births
2019 deaths
Italian male cyclists
Giro d'Italia winners
Tour de France winners
Vuelta a España winners
UCI Road World Champions (elite men)
Italian Giro d'Italia stage winners
Italian Tour de France stage winners
Italian Vuelta a España stage winners
Cyclists from the Province of Bergamo
Tour de Suisse stage winners
Olympic cyclists of Italy
Cyclists at the 1964 Summer Olympics